Mary of Scotland was a 1933 Broadway three-act play written in blank verse by Maxwell Anderson, produced by the Theatre Guild, directed by Theresa Helburn and with scenic and costume design by Robert Edmond Jones. It ran for 248 performances from November 27, 1933 to July 1934 at the Alvin Theatre. A scene between Mary and Elizabeth never actually happened as they never met. Anderson's son Quentin Anderson played a warder. It was included in Burns Mantle's The Best Plays of 1933-1934.

It was adapted into a 1936 film Mary of Scotland mostly directed by John Ford and starring Fredric March and Katharine Hepburn.

A rehearsal for the play provided the setting for a 1976 The Carol Burnett Show "Mama's Family" sketch featuring Carol Burnett, Harvey Korman, Vicki Lawrence, and guest star Madeline Kahn.

Cast

 Helen Hayes as  Mary Stuart	
 Helen Menken as Elizabeth Tudor	
 Philip Merivale as James Hepburn, 4th Earl of Bothwell
 Edgar Barrier as Lord Douglas	
 Ernest Cossart as	Lord Throgmorton	
 George Coulouris as Lord Burghley and as Lord Erskine
 Moroni Olsen as John Knox		
 Stanley Ridges as	Lord Morton					  
 Charles Dalton as Lord Huntley	
 Philip Foster as Lord Gordon	
 Wilton Graff as James Stuart Earl of Moray	
 Cecil Holm as Jamie a guard	
 William Jackson as Monk a guard	
 Anthony Kemble Cooper as Lord Darnley	
 Ernest Lawford as Maitland of Lethington	
 Philip Leigh as David Rizzio	
 Quentin Anderson as a warder
 Maurice F. Manson as a page and as Graeme a sergeant	
 Jock McGraw as Tammas a guard	
 Mary Michael as Mary Beaton	
 Cynthia Rogers as	Mary Fleming	
 Helen Shea as	Mary Seton	
 Deane Willoughby as Mary Livingston
 Edward Trevor	as Chatelard	
 Leonard Willey as Duc de Chatelherault and as Lord Ruthven

References
 
 IMDB - Mary of Scotland

External links 
 

Plays by Maxwell Anderson
1933 plays
Broadway plays
Plays set in Scotland
American plays adapted into films